David Grove (born 1935) is an American archaeologist, academic and Mesoamericanist scholar.

David Grove may also refer to:
 David Paul Grove (born 1958), Canadian actor and voice actor
  David Grove (Clean Language) (1950–2008), New Zealander psychotherapist
 David Grove (computer scientist), American computer scientist affiliated with IBM Research and University of Washington, see SIGPLAN
 David Grove (scriptwriter), American scriptwriter, wrote Beastly Boyz